The rufous motmot (Baryphthengus martii) is a near-passerine bird in the family Momotidae. It is found from northeastern Honduras south to western Ecuador, northern Bolivia, and western Brazil.

Taxonomy and systematics

The rufous motmot and rufous-capped motmot (Baryphtengus ruficapillus) are the only two species in their genus, and have sometimes been treated as conspecific and apparently form a superspecies. The rufous motmot has two recognized subspecies, the nominate  Baryphthengus martii martii and B. m. semirufus. In the early 20th century, B. m. martii was classified in its own genus, Urospatha. Later, the Nicaraguan and Costa Rican populations were considered to be a third subspecies, B. m. costaricensis, but it was decided they were part of B. m. semirufus. The binomial commemorates the German botanist and explorer Carl Friedrich Philipp von Martius.

Description

The rufous motmot is the second-largest member of its family. The female weighs . Male and female B. m. semirufus weigh  and  respectively. Adults are mainly cinnamon-rufous, with a black face mask and central breast spot, green wings and sides, a greenish-blue lower belly, and dark blue tail and flight feathers. The tail is very long, and that of B. m. semirufus but not the nominate has a bare-shafted racket tip. The bill and legs are black. Young birds are paler and duller than adults, and lack the tail rackets and black breast spot.

Distribution and habitat

The nominate subspecies of rufous motmot occurs in the western Amazon Basin in southeastern Colombia through eastern Ecuador and Peru to northern Bolivia, and east into western Brazil. The range of B. m. semirufus is separate from that of the nominate. It occurs from eastern Honduras through the Caribbean slopes of Nicaragua, Costa Rica, and Panama, and continues on the Pacific slope of Panama into northwestern Colombia and western Ecuador.

The rufous motmot inhabits humid lowland evergreen primary forest and also secondary forest. It prefers tall forest, especially along rivers and streams, but avoids dense foliage.

Behavior

Feeding

The rufous motmot is omnivorous. It has been documented eating many types of fruit, adult insects and their larva, arachnids including crustaceans, and small fish, lizards, and frogs.

Breeding

The rufous motmot's breeding and nesting phenology has few reported details. It is assumed to nest in deep burrows in earthen banks like other motmots. The clutch size and eggs are undescribed.

Vocalization

The rufous motmot's song has been described as "hoos, hoots, or hoops" . It is sometimes answered by a low owl-like hoop hoop huhuhuhuhuhu . An agitation call is a dry chatter .

Status

The IUCN has assessed the rufous motmot as being of Least Concern.

References

External links

 
Photo-Medium Res; Article marietta.edu—"The Tropical Rain Forest"
 
 

rufous motmot
Birds of Central America
Birds of the Tumbes-Chocó-Magdalena
Birds of the Amazon Basin
rufous motmot